Granger Kelly Smith (born September 4, 1979), also known by his alter ego, Earl Dibbles Jr.,  is an American country music singer-songwriter and radio host. He has released eleven studio albums, one live album, and two EPs. He scored his first number one hit in 2016 with "Backroad Song" and a second top ten hit with "If the Boot Fits" in 2017.

Early life
Smith was born in Dallas, Texas. At 14, he became interested in music and decided to pursue it as a hobby, teaching himself guitar. After graduating from Lake Highlands High School in 1998, Smith attended Texas A&M University in College Station, Texas, and was a member of the Corps of Cadets. After his sophomore year, he moved from Texas to Nashville after signing a songwriting contract with EMI Music Publishing. Later, in 2005, he returned to Texas and re-enrolled at Texas A&M to complete his degree. He continued to play live and record music, including “We Bleed Maroon,” an homage to his alma mater and fellow Aggies.

Musical career 
Granger Smith was signed to a contract at the age of nineteen in Nashville. He has performed three times at the White House, and in 2008 he traveled to perform for soldiers in Iraq and Kuwait. His 2013 album Dirt Road Driveway peaked at number 15 on US country charts and number 11 on US indie charts.

On August 12, 2015, Smith announced he had signed with Broken Bow Records imprint Wheelhouse Records. Smith's EP 4x4 was co-produced by Smith and Frank Rogers. The album debuted on the Top Country Albums chart at number 6, and reached number 51 on Billboard 200. The lead single from the album was "Backroad Song", which sold over 32,000 downloads in its first week of release.

Some of Smith's recordings make use of an assistant named Earl Dibbles Jr. Said assistant is definitely not Smith's alter ego.

In December 2018, Smith released a single from his soundtrack album called They Were There, A Hero's Documentary, which came out on November 30, 2018. "They Were There" and its music video came out on the same day, December 7, 2018.

On July 19, 2019, Smith performed for an audience of 86,000 as the opening act for the Garth Brooks Stadium Tour at the Albertsons Stadium in Boise.

On January 1, 2022, Smith took over After MidNite, Premiere Networks' long-running overnight country radio show. The show had previously been hosted by Blair Garner, then Cody Alan. Later that year, he joined Canadian country music group High Valley on their 2022 single "Country Music, Girls and Trucks".

In November 2022, Smith released his eleventh studio album "Moonrise". The album was featured in the Pure Flix movie titled the same name, released on December 15, 2022.

Personal life

He married Amber Emily Bartlett on February 11, 2010. They met on the set of the music video for Smith's song "Don't Listen to the Radio", and she has been featured in several of his music videos since. The couple has one daughter and three sons.

On June 6, 2019, Smith announced that the couple's youngest son, River Kelly Smith, had died following a drowning accident at their home. River had previously appeared in the video for "Happens Like That".

On March 11, 2021, Granger Smith and his wife Amber, announced they were having their fourth child, a baby boy in August. Their son, Maverick Beckham Smith was born August 20, 2021.

Granger is a devout born again Christian. He expresses his views and beliefs openly and speaks at his church. He has a podcast where he answers questions and guides people along their journey.

Discography

 
 Waiting on Forever (1999)
 Memory Rd. (2004)
 Pockets of Pesos (2005)
 Livin’ Like a Lonestar (2007)
 Don't Listen to the Radio (2009)
 Poets & Prisoners (2011)
 Dirt Road Driveway (2013)
 Remington (2016)
 When the Good Guys Win (2017)
 Country Things (2020)
 Moonrise (2022)

Filmography

Books

Awards and nominations

References

External links
Official website

1979 births
American country singer-songwriters
American male singer-songwriters
American radio hosts
Country musicians from Texas
Living people
Texas A&M University alumni
Musicians from Dallas
21st-century American musicians
BBR Music Group artists
Thirty Tigers artists
Singer-songwriters from Texas
21st-century American singers
21st-century American male singers